In the 2011–12 season, Trabzonspor finished in third place in the Süper Lig. The top scorer of the team was Burak Yılmaz, who scored 35 goals.

This article shows statistics of the club's players and matches during the season.

Sponsor
Türk Telekom

Players

Süper Lig

Turkish Playoff Championship Group

Turkish Cup

Third round

Fourth round

References

Trabzonspor
Trabzonspor seasons
Trabzonspor
Trabzonspor